A hybrid genre is a literary genre that blends themes and elements from two or more different genres. Works in hybrid genres are often referred to as cross-genre, multi-genre, mixed genre, or fusion genre. 

Hybrid genres are a longstanding element in the fictional process. An early example is William Blake's Marriage of Heaven and Hell, with its blend of poetry, prose, and engravings.

Examples
In contemporary literature, Dimitris Lyacos's trilogy Poena Damni combines fictional prose with drama and poetry in a multilayered narrative developing through the different characters of the work.

Many contemporary women of color have published cross-genre works, including Theresa Hak Kyung Cha, Giannina Braschi, Guadalupe Nettel, and Bhanu Kapil. Giannina Braschi creates linguistic and structural hybrids of comic fantasy and tragic comedy in Spanish, Spanglish, and English prose and poetry. Carmen Maria Machado mixes psychological realism and science fiction with both humor and elements of gothic horror. 

Dean Koontz considers himself a cross-genre writer, not a horror writer: "I write cross-genre books-suspense mixed with love story, with humor, sometimes with two tablespoons of science fiction, sometimes with a pinch of horror, sometimes with a sprinkle of paprika..."

List of hybrid genres
Action comedy (action and comedy)
Comedy drama (comedy and drama)
Comedy-horror (comedy and horror)
Comic fantasy (comedy and fantasy)
Comic science fiction (comedy and science fiction)
Crime fantasy (crime and fantasy)
Dark fantasy (horror and fantasy)
Docufiction (documentary and fiction)
Ethnofiction (ethnography and fiction)
Fantasy Western (fantasy and Western)
Horror Western (horror and Western)
Romantic comedy (romance and comedy)
Romantic fantasy (romance and fantasy)
Science fantasy (science fiction and fantasy)
Science fiction Western (science fiction and Western)
Tragicomedy (tragedy and comedy)

See also
Genre-busting
Menippean satire
Northrop Frye
Orlando: A Biography

References

Further reading
Diane P. Freedman, An Alchemy of Genres (1997)

Fiction
Genres
Literary genres
Theme